Kuala Pembuang (abbreviated: KLP) is the capital, administrative center, and economic center of Seruyan Regency, Central Kalimantan, Indonesia. Initially, Kuala Pembuang was a sub-district (in the administrative division of the Seruyan Hilir district) before being divided into two sub-districts, namely Kuala Pembuang I and Kuala Pembuang II.

Kuala Pembuang is known to be rich in natural resources and has beautiful natural scenery. Thus, this city has many places of interest to tourists.  Even so, the development of this city is still constrained by limited funds.

Geography 
Kuala Pembuang is located south of the Seruyan river (or Pembuang river). The city's coordinates are at -3.3° North Latitude and 112°.5434 East Longitude. Administratively, this city is located in Seruyan Hilir District .

History

Samudin 
Several local oral traditions mention Datuk Samudin as the first person to occupy the area around Sungai Perlu and opened access to Kuala Pembuang and established settlements there. For the people of Seruyan Hilir, Samudin is a respected person and they regard him as an ancestor.

Sultanate of Banjar
Pembuang is one of the oldest settlements in Seruyan Regency, the name of this area has already been mentioned in the Hikayat Banjar whose last part was written in 1663. The name of Pembuang was given by Prince Dipati Anta-Kasuma son of Sultan Banjar IV Mustainbillah, because originally the place was going to be the capital of the kingdom to be founded by him, but then it was canceled ( means wasted).

In 1878, Sunan Nata Alam handed over Pembuang and its surroundings to the Dutch East India Company. This area was made an Onderdistrict of the Dutch East Indies under the name Pemboewan District.

1905, The Pemboewan government with its capital in Pembuang Hulu was moved to Kuala Pembuang, due to its strategic location on the south coast, especially for government, transportation and the economic activities at that time.

Under Seruyan Administration
Seruyan District Government in 1946. The Pemboewan government was changed to a sub-district with the name Seruyan sub-district with its capital city being Kuala Pembuang.

In 2002, the Seruyan District Government was changed to Seruyan Regency with the capital city at Kuala Pembuang. Temporary Officer, Loper Anggus.

In 2003, Darwan Ali was elected as the first regent of Seruyan Regency. He then carried out construction in the Seruyan Regency area, especially the capital, Kuala Pembuang.

Government 
Kuala Pembuang is administratively divided into two sub-districts, namely Kuala Pembuang I and Kuala Pembuang II. The government of Kuala Pembuang rests on the Lurah who is appointed directly by the Regent of Seruyan Regency. The government in Kuala Pembuang is very unique because it is not regulated by a single government, but each Lurah manages his own Kelurahan. Kuala Pembuang, apart from being the Seruyan Regency capital, is also the capital of the Seruyan Hilir District.

Economy 
Most people of Kuala Pembuang work as farmers. This is because the land in Kuala Pembuang is very large while the populated area is very small. Apart from being farmers, the Kuala Pembuang people also rely on the produce from the Sea and the Pembuang River, making flatfish crackers (a typical food of the Seruyan Regency), and becoming workers. After Sudarsono's regency, Kuala Pembuang's economy began to shift to the palm oil industry, although there are still many changes that need to be made.

References 

Regency seats of Central Kalimantan
Cities in Indonesia
Seruyan Regency